Athletes from the Federal People's Republic of Yugoslavia competed at the 1948 Summer Olympics in London, England. Ninety competitors—79 men and 11 women—took part in 35 events in 8 sports.

Medalists

Athletics

Men's 400 metres
Marko Račič
Zvonko Sabolović

Men's 3000 metres steeplechase
Petar Šegedin
Đorđe Stefanović

Men's 4 × 400 metres relay
Jerko Bulić
Aleksandar Ćosić
Marko Račič
Zvonko Sabolović

Men's discus throw
Danilo Žerjal

Men's javelin throw
Dušan Vujačić
Mirko Vujačić

Men's hammer throw
Ivan Gubijan

Men's decathlon
Davorin Marčelja
Oto Rebula

Women's 100 metres
Alma Butia

Women's 200 metres
Alma Butia

Women's shot put
Marija Radosavljević

Women's discus throw
Julija Matej

Cycling

Four male cyclists represented Yugoslavia in 1948.

Individual road race
 Milan Poredski
 August Prosenik
 Aleksandar Strain
 Aleksandar Zorić

Team road race
 Milan Poredski
 August Prosenik
 Aleksandar Strain
 Aleksandar Zorić

Football

Gymnastics

Rowing

Yugoslavia had 21 male rowers participate in five out of seven rowing events in 1948.

 Men's single sculls
 Dragutin Petrovečki

Men's coxed pair

 Vladeta Ristić
 Marko Horvatin
 Duško Ðorđević (cox; semi-final)
 Predrag Sarić (cox; round one)

 Men's coxless four
 Petar Ozretić
 Ivo Lipanović
 Mate Mojtić
 Klement Alujević

 Men's coxed four
 Šime Bujas
 Stipe Krnčević
 Jakov Labura
 Daniel Krnćević
 Duško Ðorđević (cox)

 Men's eight
 Mile Petrović
 Sreta Novičić
 Sveto Drenovac
 Branko Becić
 Ivan Telesmanić
 Karlo Pavlenć
 Slobodan Jovanović
 Bogdan Sirotanović
 Predrag Sarić (cox)

Swimming

Water polo

Art competitions

References

External links
Official Olympic Reports
International Olympic Committee results database

Nations at the 1948 Summer Olympics
1948
Summer Olympics